Saint-Éloi is a parish municipality in the region of Bas-Saint-Laurent, Quebec, Canada. Its population was 310 in the Canada 2021 Census.

Demographics 

Notable residents 
Notable people born in Saint-Éloi include jazz musician Alain Caron and Quebec premier Adélard Godbout.

See also 
 List of parish municipalities in Quebec

References

External links 

Municipalité de Saint-Éloi

Parish municipalities in Quebec
Incorporated places in Bas-Saint-Laurent